Diomea is a genus of moths of the family Erebidae erected by Francis Walker in 1858.

Description
Second joint of palpi not reaching above vertex of head, but roughly scaled. Metathorax and proximal segments of abdomen with more or less prominent dorsal tufts. Forewings with more rounded apex. Hindwings with non-truncate anal angle.

Species
From the Global Lepidoptera Names Index:
Diomea absorbens Walker, [1863]
Diomea dialitha Hampson, 1926
Diomea diffusifascia Swinhoe, 1901
Diomea discisigna Sugi, 1963
Diomea eupsema Swinhoe, 1902
Diomea fenella Robinson, 1969
Diomea garroodi Holloway, 2005
Diomea hirdi Holloway, 2005
Diomea lignicolora Walker, [1858]
Diomea nigrisuffusa Holloway, 2005
Diomea orbifera Walker, 1862
Diomea rotundata Walker, [1858]
Diomea roydsi Holloway, 2005
Diomea triangulata Holloway, 2005
Diomea tricuspida Hampson, 1926

References

Calpinae